Dulal Chandra Bar is an Indian politician belonging to the Bharatiya Janata Party. He is currently representing Bagdah in the West Bengal Legislative Assembly. He was first elected from the Bagdah constituency in 2006, and then later elected from the same constituency in 2016. He is also serving as State president of BJP SC Morcha in West Bengal.

Early life and education
Bar was born at Sagarpur, a village of Bagdah to Dilip Kumar Bar in 1966. Dulal Bar graduated from Dinabandhu Mahavidyalay, Bangaon with B.Sc degree, affiliated with Calcutta University in 1995.

Controversies
In 2006, when the then opposition leader Mamata Banerjee was stopped by policemen while she was heading towards Singur, where the state government is acquiring farmlands for the Tata nano car project. Trinamool MLAs including Bar in the assembly, angered upon hearing the news and started throwing chairs and tables.

References

Living people
Bharatiya Janata Party politicians from West Bengal
West Bengal MLAs 2006–2011
West Bengal MLAs 2016–2021
University of Calcutta alumni
1966 births